"Space Soap (La Soupe aux choux)" is a novelty single, released in 2005 in France. It was produced by Mister Cosmic vs Fat Dog, from their first album Bon ça c'est fait!.

Song information
This instrumental is a remake of the theme of La Soupe aux choux, a 1981 French film directed by Jean Girault.

The single peaked at #3 in France on 9 November 2005 (with 19,397 sales that week), and reached this position after 19 weeks of presence. It remained on the chart from 2 July 2005 to 18 February 2006 (5 weeks in the top 5, 13 weeks top 10, 27 weeks top 50, and 34 weeks in the top 100).

After this unexpected success, the two DJs recorded a second single, "La Bonne du curé" (a remake of the Annie Cordy song), under the name 'Fat Dog "Puppy" & Mister Cosmic "Cosmic Cleaner". It peaked at #22 on 28 January 2006.

Track listing
 CD single
 "Space Soap (La soupe aux choux)" by Mister Cosmic — 3:08
 "I'm Not Scooby Doo" by Fat Dog — 2:54
 "What Is Love?" by Mister Cosmic — 3:18
 "My Name Is Fat Dog" by Fat Dog — 3:22

Tracks are also available via digital download.

Certifications and sales

Charts

Peak positions

Year-end charts

References

2005 songs
2005 debut singles
French songs
Instrumentals
Novelty songs
Mister Cosmic vs Fat Dog songs